Kenric James Scheevel (born July 7, 1956) is an American politician in the state of Minnesota. He served in the Minnesota State Senate.

References

1956 births
Living people
Republican Party Minnesota state senators